Eric Moisés Gálvez Sánchez (born October 4, 1983 in Puebla), known as Eric Gálvez, is a professional squash player who represented Mexico. He reached a career-high world ranking of World No. 33 in February 2007.

References

External links 
  (archive 3)
 

1983 births
Living people
Mexican male squash players
Sportspeople from Puebla
Squash players at the 2007 Pan American Games
Squash players at the 2011 Pan American Games
Squash players at the 2015 Pan American Games
Pan American Games gold medalists for Mexico
Pan American Games bronze medalists for Mexico
Pan American Games medalists in squash
Competitors at the 2005 World Games
Medalists at the 2011 Pan American Games
Medalists at the 2015 Pan American Games